Lonely Blue Boy is a studio album from Conway Twitty, released in 1960.  The title track reached number six on the U.S. Billboard Hot 100 during the winter of 1960 and became a gold record. Although unreleased, the song had originally been recorded by Elvis Presley as "Danny" for the movie King Creole.

Track listing
"Lonely Blue Boy" (Ben Weisman/Fred Wise)
"Just Because"
"Easy to Fall in Love"
"Sorry"
"My Adobe Hacienda"
"A Huggin' and a Kissin'"
"Trouble in Mind"
"Pretty Eyed Baby"
"Eternal Tears"
"Blue Moon"
"Can't We Go Steady"
"Heartbreak Hotel"

1960 albums
Conway Twitty albums
MGM Records albums